Vincent Skoglund (born 1974 in Falun, Sweden) is a Swedish photographer who lives and works in Stockholm, Sweden.

Solo exhibitions
2011 Composition of Extraction, Dalarnas Museum, Falun, Sweden 
2008 Lightyears, Gallery Jonas Kleerup, Stockholm 
2006 Adicolor, project spaces in Berlin, Paris, Hong Kong, Rome. 
2006 Adicolor, Wetterling gallery, Stockholm

Group exhibitions
2011 Black Out, Our winter show, Gallery Steinsland Berliner, Stockholm 
2011 Meditative + Calculative Works, HLP gallery, Brussels 
2009 Lightyears, Eternal return, Project space, Sweden 
2009 Lightyears, "All That Lay Ahead" Modart at Thinkspace gallery, L.A. 
2009 Lightyears, PLSMIS, Tokyo, Japan 
2008 Lightyears, Art Basel, with Modart magazine, New York 
2008 Lightyears, "Konstellations", Galleri Jonas Kleerup, Stockholm 
2007 Artists against HIV, Stockholm 
2004 Moonshine, "Modart" Munich, Germany

Collections
Dalarnas Museum, Falun, Sweden 
The National Public Art Council (Statens Konstråd) Sweden 
Handelsbanken's Art Collection (Handelsbankens Konstförening) Sweden

References

External links 
8 min Radio interview on the exhibition "Composition of Extraction
http://www.hl-projects.com/hlp/artists/#Skoglund

1974 births
Swedish photographers
Living people
People from Falun Municipality